The 2022 season was the Arizona Cardinals' 103rd in the National Football League (NFL), their 35th in Arizona, and their fourth and final under head coach Kliff Kingsbury. They attempted to become the third team in NFL history to host and win the Super Bowl as that year's Super Bowl was held at State Farm Stadium. However, they failed to improve upon their 11–6 record from the previous year after a Week 11 loss to the San Francisco 49ers and missed the postseason after a Week 15 loss against the Denver Broncos. Key season-ending injuries to their starters and inconsistencies on both the offensive and defensive sides of the ball have ultimately led to a season-ending seven-game losing streak and a third consecutive late-season collapse, as they matched a franchise record of 13 losses in a season that was set in the 2000 and 2018 squads. To add to those struggles, they had also lost eight home games this season, surpassing the 2018 squad for the most home losses in franchise history, only having won a single home game since Week 8 of the previous season. A day after the season ended, the team announced that neither head coach Kliff Kingsbury nor general manager Steve Keim would be returning the upcoming season. This would also signal the end of an era for three-time Defensive Player of the Year winner J.J. Watt, as he officially announced his retirement following an overtime loss to the Tampa Bay Buccaneers.

Draft

Draft trades

Staff

Final roster

Preseason

Regular season

Schedule

Note: Intra-division opponents are in bold text.

Game summaries

Week 1: vs. Kansas City Chiefs

The Cardinals were quickly overwhelmed by a high-powered Chiefs defense, finding themselves down 7–37 at the end of the third quarter. A late rally attempt fell well short, and Arizona was handed an 0–1 start for the first time since 2018.

Week 2: at Las Vegas Raiders

After trailing 7–23 at the end of the third quarter, the Cardinals came back to force overtime. A fumble recovery led to a Cardinals touchdown. With the win, they improved to 1–1.

Week 3: vs. Los Angeles Rams

With 1:07 left, Matt Prater attempted an onside kick, but failed. With the loss, the Cardinals dropped to 1–2.

Week 4: at Carolina Panthers

After stopping a Panthers' comeback, the Cardinals won the game 26–16. With the win, the Cardinals improved to 2–2.

Week 5: vs. Philadelphia Eagles

Not only did the Cardinals lose to the Eagles at home for the first time since 2001, but they also lost their eighth consecutive game at State Farm Stadium.

Week 6: at Seattle Seahawks

Week 7: vs. New Orleans Saints

This would be the first time the Arizona Cardinals scored more than 40 points in a game since January 1st, 2017 at the LA Rams ( 44-7 )

Week 8: at Minnesota Vikings

Week 9: vs. Seattle Seahawks

Week 10: at Los Angeles Rams

Week 11: vs. San Francisco 49ers
NFL Mexico City games

Week 12: vs. Los Angeles Chargers

Week 14: vs. New England Patriots

Week 15: at Denver Broncos

Week 16: vs. Tampa Bay Buccaneers
Christmas Day games

Week 17: at Atlanta Falcons

Week 18: at San Francisco 49ers

Standings

Division

Conference

References

External links
 

Arizona
Arizona Cardinals seasons
Arizona Cardinals